Stop the Bleeding is the debut studio album by the American Christian metal band Tourniquet. It was originally released on Intense Records in 1990. A remastered version was released independently on Pathogenic Records in 2001, which was later re-released in 2011. Retroactive Records released a remaster on June 26, 2020. The remasters include updated artwork, expanded album booklets, and bonus tracks.

Recording history 
The band recorded Stop the Bleeding at Mixing Lab A & B studio in Garden Grove, California. The band's line-up consisted of Ted Kirkpatrick, Guy Ritter, and Gary Lenaire. Session musician Mark Lewis played nearly half of the album's lead guitar solos.

Prior to the album's recording, during an "Artists vs. Label" softball game, a label executive accidentally ran over drummer Ted Kirkpatrick's foot (his main kick foot) while rounding second base, requiring Kirkpatrick to record the album under a great deal of pain.

The band faced other recording obstacles as well, such a power failure that forced the producer to mix the songs over again. In an interview in 2007, then-vocalist Guy Ritter reminisced:

In the original booklet, the band gave co-production credits to Roger Martinez, vocalist of fellow California-based Christian thrash metal group Vengeance Rising. However, Metal Blade Records' Bill Metoyer actually produced the album. Ritter said about this:

Overview 
Musically, the album was said to be "unlike anything else on the market at the time" and incorporates classical music to 1980s-inspired speed and thrash metal riffs. Guy Ritter's vocals on the album, which he said were inspired by glam metal vocalists, shift between low-baritone and high-falsetto vocals, although they were performed higher on the demo versions:

Ritter's falsetto vocals are often compared to those of King Diamond:

The album cover art features a snake restrained by chains, representing the power good has over evil and how that relates to the death and resurrection of Jesus Christ, which was the ultimate victory over Satan. The bible verse 1 John 4:4, which reads in part, "Greater is He that is in me than he that is in the world," inspired this concept.

Reception

The song "You Get What You Pray For" was the band's first single and stayed on top of the CCM metal charts for 21 weeks. It was also a GMA Dove Award nominee for "Metal Recorded Song of the Year."

The band's controversial music video for "Ark of Suffering," which contains graphic footage of animals in laboratories and slaughterhouses, received airplay on MTV before the channel ceased airing it after complaints that it was too graphic. Despite MTV's ban, the video won the Christian News Forum Contemporary Christian Music Award for "Rock Video of the Year," and Heaven's Metal magazine readers voted it their "Favorite Video of the Year." The music video was later included on the VHS tapes Hot Metal 4 in 1991 and Video Biopsy in 1992, as well as the DVD Ocular Digital in 2003.

About the song's airplay, Ritter said:

Track listing

1. Excluded from the 2011 Brazilian remaster.

Personnel

Album 
 Ted Kirkpatrick – drums, bass
 Guy Ritter – vocals
 Gary Lenaire – guitars, vocals, bass
 Mark Lewis – lead guitars
 Erik Jan James - Bass

2000 live tracks 
Ted Kirkpatrick – drums
Luke Easter – vocals
Aaron Guerra – guitars, vocals
Steve Andino – bass

1990 demo tracks
Ted Kirkpatrick – drums, bass, rhythm guitars
Guy Ritter – vocals
Gary Lenaire – guitars, vocals
Mark Lewis – lead guitars

1999 live concert intro 
Aaron Guerra – arrangement and mix

References

External links 
 Stop the Bleeding (1990) at Tourniquet.net
 Stop the Bleeding (2001) at Tourniquet.net

Tourniquet (band) albums
1990 albums